The Eleventh Mother of all Battles Championship, commonly referred to as the 2001 Iraqi Elite Cup, was the eleventh occurrence of the Iraqi Elite Cup. The competition was organised by the Iraq Football Association and the top eight teams of the 2000–01 Iraqi Elite League competed in the tournament. Despite being the 2001 edition, the competition was held in 2002, from 1 February to 10 February. In the final, held at Al-Shaab Stadium, Al-Shorta defeated Al-Talaba 1–0 to win the cup for the second time in a row.

Group stage

Group 1

Group 2

Semifinals

Third place match

Final

Awards

References

External links
 Iraqi Football Website

2001–02 in Iraqi football
Football competitions in Iraq